This article lists the squads of all participating teams in the 2019 Women's FIH Pro League. The nine national teams involved in the tournament were required to register a squad of up to 32 players.

Argentina
The following 32 players appeared in the Argentina squad for the 2019 FIH Pro League.

Head coach: Carlos Retegui

Australia
The following 30 players appeared in the Australia squad for the 2019 FIH Pro League.

Head coach: Paul Gaudoin

Belgium
The following 25 players appeared in the Belgium squad for the 2019 FIH Pro League.

Head coach: Niels Thiessen

China
The following 28 players appeared in the China squad for the 2019 FIH Pro League.

Head coach: Huang Yongsheng

Germany
The following 28 players appeared in the Germany squad for the 2019 FIH Pro League.

Head coach:  Xavier Reckinger

Great Britain
The following 31 players appeared in the Great Britain squad for the 2019 FIH Pro League.

Head coach:  Mark Hager

Netherlands
The following 33 players appeared in the Netherlands squad for the 2019 FIH Pro League.

Head coach:  Alyson Annan

New Zealand
The following 30 players appeared in the New Zealand squad for the 2019 FIH Pro League.

Head coach:  Graham Shaw

United States
The following 29 players appeared in the United States squad for the 2019 FIH Pro League.

Head coach:  Janneke Schopman

References

Women's FIH Pro League squads
Squads